Florissant may refer to:

 Florissant, Colorado, a census-designated place
 Florissant Fossil Beds National Monument, a United States National Monument, Colorado
 Florissant, Missouri, a city
 Florissant Township, St. Louis County, Missouri

See also
 Florissantia (plant), an extinct species of flowering plants
 Florissantia (planthopper), an extinct plant hopper genus
 Floris (disambiguation)